LevLandlig (Norwegian: Living in the Countryside) is a Norwegian monthly lifestyle magazine with a special emphasis on country life. The magazine is one of the rare publications about country living. It also covers articles about interior design.

Overview
The magazine was launched in 2000 with the title Landliv – et godt liv på landet (Norwegian: Country Living – A good life in the countryside). The magazine is part of the Egmont Group and is published by the Egmont Publishing AS. Its former publisher was the Tun Media AS. As of 2010 LevLandlig was published on a bimonthly basis. The headquarters of the magazine is in Oslo.

In 2012 LevLandlig enjoyed circulation growth.

References

External links

2000 establishments in Norway
Bi-monthly magazines published in Norway
Design magazines
Lifestyle magazines
Magazines established in 2000
Magazines published in Oslo
Monthly magazines published in Norway
Norwegian-language magazines